Kitty Foyle is an American old-time radio and television soap opera originally aired during the 1940s and 1950s that was based on the 1940 film of the same name starring Ginger Rogers. Kitty Foyle was created by soap opera mogul Irna Phillips of Guiding Light fame and produced by daytime radio monarchs Frank and Anne Hummert of Helen Trent recognition. The program originally starred Julie Stevens in the title role of Kitty Foyle on radio. On television, the title role was portrayed by Kathleen Murray.

Each episode primarily focused on Foyle's ongoing relationship with a doctor in the neighborhood, (played on radio by Bud Collyer and on television by William Redfield), and the relationship between her and her father. Each episode also usually involved a flashback and was set in Philadelphia.

The radio version of Kitty Foyle ran on NBC's daytime schedule from October 5, 1942–June 9, 1944. NBC Television aired the show during the afternoons from January 13–June 27, 1958.

Radio program

Kitty Foyle originally began on the radio. The program evolved from a segment on the short-lived radio program Stories America Loves which only ran a year on CBS. The first Kitty Foyle segment was broadcast in June 1942. However, the program had further origin to a 1939 best-selling novel written by Christopher Morley. The novel became the premise for the popular 1940 film of the same name starring Ginger Rogers. The film also resulted in a popular dress of the 1940s.

The program was created by soap opera mogul Irna Phillips and was produced by daytime radio monarchs Frank and Anne Hummert.

The program starred future Helen Trent, (another Hummert production), star Julie Stevens in the title role of Kitty Foyle. Bud Collyer, who was the voice of Superman at the time, portrayed the role of Wyn Strafford, the love interest of Kitty Foyle. Also apart of the Foyle family were Mark Smith and Victor Thorley who portrayed Kitty's father Pop Foyle and her brother Ed Foyle, respectively. Sportscaster Mel Allen served as the announcer.

The soap opera was broadcast from October 5, 1942 to June 9, 1944 on CBS Radio. The program was sponsored by General Mills.

History

Christopher Morley's Kitty Foyle 
In 1939, Christopher Morley wrote and published a novel also titled Kitty Foyle. The plot of the novel tells the story of a white-collar girl who falls in love with a young socialite, despite the objections of his family. Contemporary Authors noted: "Central to the story is protagonist Kitty's affair with the affluent Wyn Strafford. Critics heatedly debated Morley's sexual sensationalism," notably her out-of-wedlock pregnancy and abortion.

The story is told by Kitty in the first person. A sociologist suggests that "Kitty, in her observations of the mores and behavior patterns of the upper class acts as the anthropological alter ego of Morley, viewing the upper class from the outside."

The book was a bestseller in 1939 and 1940.

1940 film

Formation

Irna Phillips
In 1941, Irna Phillips, creator of the popular soap opera Guiding Light, first proposed the idea of a serialized version of the award-winning film released a year earlier to Lady Esther cosmetics. Unfortunately, Lady Esther rejected but General Mills soon would except.

General Mills, the Hummerts and Stories America Loves
By the early 1940s, General Mills had been looking for a way to break into radio. Their first big break came in 1941 when the company became the official sponsor of The Lone Ranger radio program. But within months after landing sponsorship of The Lone Ranger, the company were approached with the idea of a radio program that took popular novels of the time (past or present) and make serialized productions of them. The program was entitled Stories America Loves.

Stories America Loves premiered on CBS October 6, 1941. The program didn't get very much attention until June 1942 when the program began to broadcast segments of the novel Kitty Foyle. The segments became so popular in fact that the rotating story concept of the program was abandoned and by the fall of 1942, the serial Kitty Foyle  took over the daytime timeslot of its predecessor.

Frank and Anne Hummert would become the producers of the new program. Stories ended its run on October 16, 1942. Kitty Foyle made its radio debut on October 5, 1942. The program premiered to relatively good ratings but soon would drop in the ratings. The program lasted two seasons and ended its run on June 9, 1944.

Television serial

On January 13, 1958, Kitty Foyle premiered on NBC Television. Under new direction and an all new cast, the show went underway. When it premiered, Kitty Foyle was NBC's first thirty-minute soap opera. At the time, 15 minutes was the standard for a televised daytime soap opera.

The televised version of Kitty Foyle starred up-and-coming actress Kathleen Murray in the title role of Irish secretary Kitty Foyle. The program also starred actor William Redfield as Foyle's love interest Wyn Strafford and character actors Bob Hastings and Ralph Dunn in the roles of her brother Ed and father 'Pop' Foyle, respectively. Also in the cast were Judy Lewis, Les Damon and a very young Patty Duke.

The series was produced by Charles Irving. Carlton E. Morse, writer for radio's One Man's Family, served as head writer of the series. Hal Cooper was the director of the series and the series was packaged and distributed by Henry Jaffee Enterprises.

The television version of Kitty Foyle did not go well with viewers. The story seemed tailor-made for the daytime serial market, but it wasn't.  Perhaps the story was too familiar, or perhaps once the basic story was told, there was nothing else to say about Kitty and her problems. the Other sources speculate that one reason it was not successful was that the main character, Kitty Foyle, was not introduced until five weeks into the program.

The serial only lasted five months and ended its network television run on June 27, 1958.

Cast and characters

On radio

Main cast
Julie Stevens as Kitty Foyle  
Bud Collyer as Dr. Wynnewood 'Wyn' Strafford VI  
Mark Smith as 'Pop' Foyle  
Victor Thorley as Ed Foyle

Supporting cast
Amanda Randolph

On television

Main
Kathleen Murray as Kitty Foyle  
William Redfield as Dr. Wynnewood 'Wyn' Strafford VI  
Ralph Dunn as 'Pop' Foyle 
Bob Hastings as Ed Foyle

Supporting
Kay Medford as Sophie Foyle
Larry Robinson as Mac Foyle
Judy Lewis as Molly Scharf
Les Damon as Rosie Rittenhouse 
Marie Worsham as Stacy Lee Balla

Broadcast history
On the radio, Kitty Foyle could be heard every weekday for 15 minutes from 1942 to 1944 beginning at 10:15 a.m. over CBS Radio. On television, the program could be seen every weekday for thirty minutes beginning at 2:30 pm on NBC.

See also
List of radio soaps

References

External links

1940s American radio programs
1942 radio programme debuts
1943 radio programme endings
1958 American television series debuts
1958 American television series endings
Radio programs based on films
American radio soap operas
American television soap operas
NBC original programming
Black-and-white American television shows
CBS Radio programs
English-language television shows
Television series created by Irna Phillips